François-Henry Laperrine (born Marie Joseph François Henry Laperrine d'Hautpoul, September 29, 1860 - March 5, 1920) was a French general who served during World War I.

Biography 
Laperrine entered the École Spéciale Militaire de Saint-Cyr in October 1878 and became a captain in the 2nd Dragoons in November 1891. Laperrine organized the Compagnie Méharistes Sahariennes in 1897.  He was a friend of Charles de Foucauld who was killed in 1916 in Tamanrasset. The two were honored on a stamp of Algeria in 1950. 

Laperrine died after a plane crash (a Breguet) in the Sahara in 1920. His companions, Lieutenant Bernard and mechanic Marcel Vasselin survived and recorded Le Peerrine's last words, "People think they know the desert...People think I know it. Nobody really knows it. I have crossed the Sahara ten times and I will stay here."  Bernard and Vasselin buried Laperrine near the plane, but when a rescue party arrived he was disinterred and buried in Tamanrasset next to Foucauld. The fort was named for Laperrine.

Honors 

Grand officier de la Légion d'honneur
Croix de guerre 1914-1918
Médaille coloniale avec agrafes Algérie, Soudan, Sénégal, Sahara, AOF
Croix de guerre belge 1914-1918 avec palme

References

Further reading 

Lehuraux, Léon. Laperrine, le saharien. Paris: Éditions de l'Encyclopédie de l'Empire français, 1947.

External links
 

1860 births
1920 deaths
École Spéciale Militaire de Saint-Cyr alumni
French generals
French military personnel of World War I
Grand Officiers of the Légion d'honneur
People from Castelnaudary
Recipients of the Croix de guerre (Belgium)
Recipients of the Croix de Guerre 1914–1918 (France)
Victims of aviation accidents or incidents in Africa
Victims of aviation accidents or incidents in 1920